Asnawar is a small town in Jhalawar district, Rajasthan, India, with a population of about 15,000. It was formerly known as Aasnaver. Also famous temples like rata devi, kham kheda , modi ki jahar .

History 
The Town of Asnawar is situated in the south-eastern region of Rajasthan, a region widely known as Malwa, the land of malwas. The Jhalawar district is part of Malwa region of Rajasthan.

Asnawar was merged on 1 November 1956.[1] Reason for merging was that it was far from Madhya Pradesh. At present it is located in southern-western part of Jhalawar district of Rajasthan.

The state of Jhalawar (now a district) was founded on 8 April 1838, out of the Kota territory. Jhalawar state got rise as a result of a treaty between English rulers, Kota state, and Malwa state.

Geography 
At the border of Rajasthan and Madhya Pradesh, nudging its fat belly into neighboring MP is this fascinating place - Asnawar.

 Nearby Airports (200 miles): Kota(KHO, 92.6476 miles), Indore(IDR, 123.35 miles), Gwalior(GWL, 151.108 miles), Jaipur(JAI, 177.505 miles).

Asnawar area is an expanse of fertile plain having rich black-cotton soil. It is watered by several rivers, giving it a verdant look. Aahu  etc.

Climate 
The climate of the area is very much similar to that of the Indo-Gangatic plain, with hot dry summer and delightfully cold winters. The monsoon is, however, quite unlike and very distinct from the oppressive humid climate of the North India plains. Asnawar (Jhalawar district) is known for the highest rainfall in the Rajasthan state. An average of 35 inches of rainfall keeps it cool, and gentle breezes ward off the stifling humidity.

 Summer   : 47.0 °C (Max), 32.5 °C (Min)
 Winter   : 32.5 °C (Max), 9.5 °C (Min)
 Average Rainfall : 943 mm (Per Year)
 Best Season to travel : September - March

Demographics 
 India census, Asnawar had a population of 15,000. Males constitute 52% of the population and females 48%. Asnawar has an average literacy rate of 61%, higher than the national average of 59.5%; with 62% of the males and 38% of females literate. 17% of the population is under 6 years of age.

Economy
Economy is based on agriculture in area. This area is known for the highest rainfall in the Rajasthan state. This rain is very helpful for the farmers of the region. Besides this satisfying rainfall, district has a lot of irrigation dams, ponds, and medium scale projects, that are serving according to the needs of farmers. 
 
District area of Asnawar, Jhalawar is also known for the Production of Citrus (Oranges). The area around Bhawani Mandi has the distinction of being an important place on the International and National Citrus (Naarangi) fruit map. Orange-laden orchards provide a tempting sight. Citrus produced in Jhalawar region are of export-quality, and are exported to various foreign countries. Citrus-belt is spread around the Bhawani Mandi, Jhalawar and Pirawa sub-divisions. 
 
Agricultural Information of Area

Total land area (irrigated) : 60%
Total land area (non-irrigated) : 40%

Major crops of the region 
KHARIF 
Soya Bean :   
Pulses :  
Jowar :  
Maize :

RABI 
Wheat :   
Mustard : 
Grain :  
Coriander :

Education 
For Higher Education :
 Government Higher Secondary School
 Govt Girls Higher Secondary School
Model senior secondary school

References 

Cities and towns in Jhalawar district